Mladen Krstajić (born 4 March 1974) is a Serbian professional football manager and former player who played as a centre-back.

He represented Serbia and Montenegro at the 2006 FIFA World Cup. From January 2015 until March 2020, Krstajić served the role of chairman of the board of Bosnian Premier League club Radnik Bijeljina. Krstajić coached Serbia at the 2018 FIFA World Cup and then became head coach of Maccabi Tel Aviv in December 2021. He is the current manager of the Bulgaria national football team.

Club career

Early career
Krstajić was born and raised in Zenica, SFR Yugoslavia, present day Bosnia and Herzegovina to a Bosnian Serb mother from Bijeljina and a father from Žabljak, Montenegro. After playing in the youth teams of Čelik Zenica, Krstajić moved to Kikinda, FR Yugoslavia, present day Serbia in April 1992, following the breakout of the Bosnian War. He started playing with Senta for six months. He then moved to OFK Kikinda, at that time a first league club. At some point of a successful career as a Serbian football player, there comes the time, to decide, whether one wants to play for Partizan or for Red Star Belgrade, and Krstajić decided to take the move to Partizan in 1996. According to Krstajić himself, Red Star was interested in him, but as he comes from a family that cheers for Partizan, he decided to sign a contract with his favourite club. His four and a half years at Partizan were more than successful, winning the national championships three times (1996, 1997, 1999) and also the national cup in 1998.

Werder Bremen and Schalke 04

In 2000, Krstajić joined German Bundesliga club Werder Bremen who paid a DM 1.8 million (about €950,000) transfer fee to Partizan. At Werder Bremen he was initially deployed at left-back in his first season but became one of the best central defenders in the Bundesliga, winning the double of Bundesliga and cup with Werder in 2004.

In 2004 he joined Schalke 04, where he was named the new captain on 17 March 2009.

Partizan
On 5 June 2009, Krstajić signed a two-year contract with his former club Partizan. In January 2010, after the departure of Nenad Đorđević, he was named the new Partizan captain. After two very successful seasons, Krstajić played his last professional match on 21 May 2011.

International career
Krstajić was a part of the Serbia and Montenegro national team "Famous Four" defence, which conceded just one goal during the qualifying for the 2006 FIFA World Cup. The other members of the famous four were Ivica Dragutinović, Goran Gavrančić and Nemanja Vidić.

Between 1999 and 2008 he made 58 international appearances scoring 2 goals. He represented three senior national sides: FR Yugoslavia (1992–2002; 20 appearances, 2 goals), Serbia and Montenegro (2002–2006; 27 appearances), and Serbia (2006–2008; 11 appearances).

Managerial career

Serbia
Krstajić began his managerial career as assistant coach of the Serbia national team for the 2018 FIFA World Cup qualifiers.

In October 2017 after head coach Slavoljub Muslin's dismissal, Krstajić succeeded him as head coach of the Serbia national team, initially as caretaker. Krstajić led the team on the Asian tour where Serbia defeated China (2–0) and drew with South Korea (1–1). In December, it was announced he would take on the role permanently and at least until the end of the 2018 FIFA World Cup.

On 13 June 2019, Krstajić was sacked from the position after a dismal 5–0 loss in a UEFA Euro 2020 qualifier against Ukraine.

TSC
Krstajić became head coach of TSC in January 2021. He left the club in October.

Maccabi Tel Aviv
On 9 December 2021, Krstajić was appointed manager of Israeli Premier League club Maccabi Tel Aviv.

Bulgaria
On 21 July 2022, Krstajić was named head coach of the Bulgaria national team until 2024.

Administrative career
Immediately after retiring from playing, Krstajić was appointed as the new director of football of FK Partizan on 1 June 2011. During the mid-season break, Krstajić attacked club president Dragan Đurić through the media, following Đurić's claim that Krstajić and head coach Aleksandar Stanojević were solely responsible for the unsuccessful campaign in UEFA competitions for the 2011–12 season. Krstajić stated that he and Stanojević did not have full control over the sale and acquisition of players during the summer transfer window, which affected the results on the field. On 26 December 2011, after less than six months as director of football, he was sacked.

Before becoming a manager, Krstajić became the new chairman of the board of Bosnian Premier League club Radnik Bijeljina on 23 January 2015.

During his time as club chairman, Radnik became a stable Bosnian Premier League club, finishing almost always in the top five or six. It won its first ever national and major trophy, the Bosnian Cup in the 2015–16 season and thus qualified for its first ever UEFA competition, the 2016–17 UEFA Europa League qualifying rounds.

In the 2018–19 Bosnian Premier League season, Radnik finished in fifth place, but as fourth placed Željezničar did not get an UEFA license to compete in the following season's UEFA Europa League, Radnik was qualified by default to the 2019–20 UEFA Europa League qualifying rounds for a second time in its history.

On 27 December 2019, Krstajić unexpectedly decided to leave Radnik, stating that it was time for someone new to lead the club. He officially left the club on 28 March 2020, with Predrag Perković succeeding him as chairman.

Career statistics

Club

International

Managerial statistics

Honours

Player
Partizan 
Serbian SuperLiga: 1995–96, 1996–97, 1998–99, 2009–10, 2010–11
Serbian Cup: 1997–98, 2010–11

Werder Bremen
Bundesliga: 2003–04
DFB-Pokal: 2003–04

Schalke 04
DFB-Ligapokal: 2005
UEFA Intertoto Cup: 2004

Notes

References

External links

 
 Mladen Krstajić at reprezentacija.rs 
 
 

1974 births
Living people
Sportspeople from Zenica
Serbs of Bosnia and Herzegovina
Serbian footballers
Association football defenders
Serbia and Montenegro international footballers
Serbia international footballers
Serbian people of Montenegrin descent
2006 FIFA World Cup players
FK Senta players
OFK Kikinda players
FK Partizan players
Serbian SuperLiga players
SV Werder Bremen players
FC Schalke 04 players
Bundesliga players
Serbia and Montenegro expatriate footballers
Serbia and Montenegro footballers
Serbian expatriate footballers
Serbia and Montenegro expatriate sportspeople in Germany
Expatriate footballers in Germany
Serbian expatriate sportspeople in Germany
FK Partizan non-playing staff
Serbian football chairmen and investors
Serbian football managers
Serbia national football team managers
FK TSC Bačka Topola managers
2018 FIFA World Cup managers
Israeli Premier League managers
Bulgaria national football team managers